Country roads, another name for rural roads (other similar names include bridle path), may also refer to:
 Country Roads (TV series)
 Country Roads & Other Places
 "Take Me Home, Country Roads," a song by American musician John Denver

See also 

 Country road (disambiguation)